Kye Gompa (also spelled Kyi, Ki, Key, or Kee - pronounced like the English word key) is a Tibetan Buddhist monastery of the Gelugpa sect located on top of a hill at an altitude of  above sea level, close to the Spiti River, in the Spiti Valley of Himachal Pradesh, Lahaul and Spiti district, India.

It is the largest  monastery of the Spiti Valley and a religious training centre for lamas. It reportedly had 100 monks in 1855.

The monastery is dedicated to Lochen Tulku, the 24th  reincarnation of the great translator Lotsawa Rinchen Zangpo.

History

Kye Gompa is said to have been founded by Dromtön (Brom-ston, 1008-1064 CE), a pupil of the famous teacher, Atisha, in the 11th century. This may, however, refer to a now destroyed Kadampa monastery at the nearby village of Rangrik, which was probably destroyed in the 14th century when the Sakya sect rose to power with Mongol assistance.

Kye was attacked again by the Mongols during the 17th century, during the reign of the Fifth Dalai Lama, and became a Gelugpa establishment. In 1830, it was sacked again during the wars between Ladakh and Kulu. In 1841, it was severely damaged by the Dogra army under Ghulam Khan and Rahim Khan. Later that same year, it suffered more damage from a Sikhs. In the 1840s, it was ravaged by fire and, in 1975, a violent earthquake caused further damage which was repaired with the help of the Archaeological Survey of India and the State Public Works Department.

The walls of the monastery are covered with paintings and murals, an example of the 14th century monastic architecture, which developed as the result of Chinese influence.

Kye monastery has a collection of ancient murals and books, including Buddha images.

There are three floors, the first one is mainly underground and used for storage. One room, called the Tangyur is richly painted with murals. The ground floor has the beautifully decorated Assembly Hall and cells for many monks.

Kye Gompa now belongs to the Gelugpa sect, along with Tabo Monastery and Dhankar Gompa, one of three in Spiti.

The monastery of Kee, for instance, accommodates nearly 250 monks, who reside within the sacred walls throughout the year. Some monks go to South Indian Monasteries during winters, the rest of them stay inside the monastery walls. These monasteries have their regular heads; these heads are the reincarnations of Guru Rinpoche. The current head of Kee Monastery is from Kinnaur district of Himachal Pradesh. He is 19th birth of Guru Rinpoche.
A celebration of its millennium was conducted in 2000 in the presence of the Dalai Lama. A new Prayer Hall was inaugurated on 3 August 2000 by the Fourteenth Dalai Lama.
It was presented through a tableau in the 69th Republic Day celebration held at Delhi.

In recent times the monastery has also hosted the "Kachen Dugyal Memorial Old Aged - Handicapped Society" which provide accommodation for a number of elderly and disabled people.

Gallery

See also
List of highest towns by country

Footnotes

References
Handa, O. C. (1987). Buddhist Monasteries in Himachal Pradesh. Indus Publishing Company, New Delhi. .
Harcourt, A. F. P. (1871). On the Himalayan Valleys:— Kooloo, Lahoul, and Spiti. Proceedings of the Royal Geographical Society of London, Vol. 15, No. 5, 336–343.
 Kapadia, Harish. (1999). Spiti: Adventures in the Trans-Himalaya. 2nd Edition. Indus Publishing Company, New Delhi. .
 Janet Rizvi. (1996). Ladakh: Crossroads of High Asia. Second Edition. Oxford University Press, Delhi. .
 Cunningham, Alexander. (1854). LADĀK: Physical, Statistical, and Historical with Notices of the Surrounding Countries. London. Reprint: Sagar Publications (1977).
Francke, A. H. (1977). A History of Ladakh. (Originally published as, A History of Western Tibet, (1907). 1977 Edition with critical introduction and annotations by S. S. Gergan & F. M. Hassnain. Sterling Publishers, New Delhi.
Francke, A. H. (1914). Antiquities of Indian Tibet. Two Volumes. Calcutta. 1972 reprint: S. Chand, New Delhi.
Sarina Singh, et al. India. (2007). 12th Edition. Lonely Planet. .

External links

360-degrees panoramic images

Buddhism in Lahaul and Spiti district
Buddhist monasteries in Himachal Pradesh
Buildings and structures in Lahaul and Spiti district
Gelug monasteries and temples